National Academy of Higher Education (NAHE) identifies itself as an organization specializing in evaluation of people's educational credentials.  Some United States educational authorities identify it as an unrecognized accreditation organization or accreditation mill.  NAHE charges fees for a service described as an evaluation of the educational credentials of clients who have studied in other countries or attained degrees through alternative methods.

Association of Distance Learning Programs
The NAHE subsidiary Association of Distance Learning Programs (ADLP) offers "accreditation" for all types of educational programs world-wide, including schools, colleges, distance learning programs, evaluation of experiential learning, and other non-traditional education programs. ADLP is not, however, recognized by either the United States Department of Education (USDE) or Council for Higher Education Accreditation (CHEA) as a nationally recognized accrediting agency.

Accreditation of diploma mills 

Some organizations, including Concordia College and University, Lacrosse University, and The American University of London, that have been identified as diploma mills claim to be "recognized" by NAHE or "accredited" by ADLP . Credential Watch lists both NAHE and ADLP as unrecognized educational accreditation agencies. The California Postsecondary Education Commission lists NAHE as an unrecognized accreditation agency. Accreditation by unrecognized organizations has no known academic value. Organizations that claim accreditation or approval by ADLP and NAHE sometimes acknowledge in their promotional materials that these organizations are unrecognized, but suggest that it is not important for accrediting bodies to have government recognition. For example, the Lacrosse University website states:

People who obtain "degrees" from diploma mills that make these types of statements are likely to find that the credentials they bought are not accepted by academic institutions, governments, or employers.

Website
The website of National Academy of Higher Education  is www.nahighered.co.cc, a free URL redirection address; co.cc is an ordinary second-level Cocos (Keeling) Islands domain like any other. The co.cc redirector bills itself as "your free domain for blog" and the nahighered page itself consists of an archived Wayback Machine page from 2005 as nahighered.org, a domain registered using a Canadian whois-privacy service and pointing to a Boston server that is not currently functional.

National Academy of Higher Education, Pakistan 
There is a legitimate organization with the name "National Academy of Higher Education" in Pakistan. The organization in Pakistan was not intended to be an educational accreditation body and is not connected to the "National Academy of Higher Education" accreditation mill.

Its purpose is solely as a resource for professional development of educators at existing educational institutions. According to the Higher Education Commission, "National Academy of Higher Education is a new initiative of Higher Education Commission for faculty development in the higher education institutions. The objective is to enhance basic competencies in academic practice in higher education."

See also
List of unrecognized accreditation associations of higher learning
Accreditation mill
Education in the United States

References

Unrecognized accreditation associations